Heteroturris gemmuloides is a species of sea snail, a marine gastropod mollusk in the family Borsoniidae.

Description
The length of the shell attains 40.4 mm.

Distribution
This marine species occurs off Eastern Indonesia.

References

 Sysoev, Alexander. Mollusca Gastropoda: new deep-water turrid gastropods (Conoidea) from eastern Indonesia. Muséum national d'Histoire naturelle, 1997.

External links
 
  Bouchet P., Kantor Yu.I., Sysoev A. & Puillandre N. (2011) A new operational classification of the Conoidea. Journal of Molluscan Studies 77: 273–308
 MNHN, Paris: Heteroturris gemmuloides (holotype)
 

gemmuloides
Gastropods described in 1997